The Image of the Divine Mercy is a depiction of Jesus Christ that is based on the devotion initiated by Faustina Kowalska.

According to Kowalska's diary, Jesus told her "I promise that the soul that will venerate this image will not perish. I also promise victory over enemies already here on earth, especially at the hour of death. I myself will defend it as My own glory." (Diary 48)

Jesus is shown, in most versions, as raising his right hand in blessing and pointing with his left hand on the Sacred Heart from which flow forth two rays: one red and one pale. The depiction contains the message "Jesus I trust in you" (Polish: Jezu ufam Tobie). The rays that stream out have symbolic meanings: red for the blood of Jesus, and pale for the water (which justifies souls). The whole image is a symbol of charity, forgiveness and love of God, referred to as the "Fountain of Mercy". According to Kowalska's diary, the image is based on her 1931 vision of Jesus.

Kowalska directed the painting of the first image in Vilnius by the artist Eugeniusz Kazimirowski. Since then, numerous versions of the image have been painted by other artists, including a popular rendition by Adolf Hyła in Kraków. They are widely venerated worldwide and are used in the celebration of Divine Mercy Sunday, observed in Roman Catholic as well as some Anglican churches.

Background

Kowalska was a Polish nun who joined the convent of Our Lady of Mercy, in Warsaw, in 1925. In her diary, which was later published as the book Diary: Divine Mercy in My Soul, Kowalska wrote about a number of visions of Jesus and conversations with him. Her confessor was Michael Sopocko, a priest and a professor of theology.

In 1930, Kowalska was assigned to the convent in Płock, Poland. Kowalska stated that in her cell on the night of Sunday, 22 February 1931, Jesus appeared to her as the "King of Divine Mercy" and was robed in a white garment.

Kowalska wrote that Jesus' right hand was raised in a sign of blessing, the other was touching the garment near his breast, and that from beneath the garment slightly down, aside his breast, emanated two large rays, one red, the other white.

In her diary (Notebook 1, items 47 and 48), she wrote that Jesus told her:

Another nun, Sister Christine, later stated that rays of light from the window were visible that night and attracted the attention of people standing on the other side of the street, implying that it was a "physical" appearance, rather than an interior vision.

Not knowing how to paint, Kowalska approached some other nuns at her convent for help but received no assistance. She attempted to sketch the image with charcoal on canvas but had little success. In her diary (Notebook 1, item 53), she wrote that Jesus told her that she would receive "visible help" with the task. In November 1932, Kowalska left Płock and returned to Warsaw, and in May 1933, she was sent to the convent in Vilnius to work as the gardener.

In Vilnius, Kowalska met the priest Michał Sopoćko, the newly-appointed confessor to the nuns. Sopocko supported Kowalska's efforts and arranged for the first painting of the image by the artist Eugeniusz Kazimirowski, which was the only rendition that Kowalska saw. After Kowalska's death, a number of other artists painted their own versions of the image, with the depiction by Adolf Hyła being among the most reproduced ones.

Devotional significance

After the canonisation of Kowalska in April 2000, devotion to the Divine Mercy and the image has increased. The devotional following of the image and Kowalska's message has been stronger among Catholics at large than among theologians. The author Benedict Groeschel considered a modest estimate of the following in 2010 to be over 100 million Catholics.

Kowalska's diary relates the rays of light within the image to life and salvation, stating (Notebook 1, item 299) that she was told by Jesus:

Kowalska also wrote that Jesus stressed the importance of the image as part of the Divine Mercy devotion, and in Notebook 1, item 327, she attributed these words to Jesus:

Catholic devotions thus stress the importance of the image as a "conduit for grace" as part of the Divine Mercy message.

Kowalska's diary also relates the image to Divine Mercy Sunday. Kowalska wrote (Notebook 1, item 49) that Jesus told her that he wanted the Divine Mercy image to be "solemnly blessed" on the first Sunday after Easter; and that Sunday was to be the Feast of Mercy.

Pope John Paul II instituted Divine Mercy Sunday (Dominica II Paschae seu de divina misericordia) and placed it on the General Roman Calendar. The Divine Mercy image is often carried in processions on Divine Mercy Sunday and is placed in a location in the church so that it can be venerated by those who attended Mass.

The veneration of the Divine Mercy image also takes place in conjunction with the Divine Mercy Chaplet and Novena.<ref>Sourcebook for Sundays and Seasons 2008 by D. Todd Williamson 2007  page 195</ref> The Vatican biography of Kowalska states that the veneration of the Divine Mercy image is part of the second component of her message, "entreating God's mercy for the whole world". Praying before the Divine Mercy image (with the signature "Jesus I trust in you") is not only encouraged in Catholic devotions but also mentioned as a partial condition for some of the indulgences associated with Divine Mercy Sunday.

Artistic renditions

First painting

The first painting was made by Eugeniusz Kazimirowski, under the supervision of Kowalska and her confessor, Sopoćko, in Vilnius. Sopocko was a professor of theology at the University of Vilnius and introduced Kowalska to Kazimirowski, who was a professor of art there and had painted other religious images. Kowalska gave Kazimirowski specific instructions about the appearance and the posture of the image, which she said she had received from Jesus Christ in a vision. Sopocko himself posed as Jesus for the image as wearing an alb, and both he and Kowalska regularly visited the painter's workshop. The final painting satisfied neither Sopocko nor Kowalska, who later wrote that Jesus told her it was not that important for the picture to be beautiful since true beauty would be the blessing that he would bestow upon people by means of the painting.

After its completion in 1934, the Kazimirowski painting first hung in the Bernardine Sisters' convent near the church of St. Michael, where Sopoćko was a rector. In her diary, Kowalska wrote that Jesus told her to inform her confessor that the proper place for the painting was in a church, not in the hallway of a convent. The first public exposition of the Kazimirowski painting was on 26–28 April 1935, at the Church of the Gate of Dawn in Vilnius. In 1937, on the Sunday after Easter, later instituted as Divine Mercy Sunday by Pope John Paul II, the painting was put on display beside the main altar in St. Michael’s Church in Vilnius. The image, including small reproductions of it on various devotional materials, was used by Sopoćko in promoting devotion to the Divine Mercy.

In 1948, the Soviet authorities, who then occupied Lithuania, closed St. Michael's Church. The painting remained in the disused church building until 1951, when two pious women from Vilnius, Bronė Miniotaitė and Janina Rodzevič, bought the canvas from a guard and concealed it in an attic for several years. Later, they gave it to the parish priest at the Dominican Church of the Holy Spirit for safekeeping, but he chose not to display it in the church. Sopocko, who had relocated to Poland but was unable to take the painting with him, expressed concern about it to his friend Józef Grasewicz, who obtained the painting and moved it to his own parish church in Nova Ruda, Belarus. There, it was displayed and venerated by the local parishioners. In 1970, the Soviets closed that church and used it as a storage warehouse but left the painting hanging in the disused church, where parishioners continued to venerate it in secret. In 1986, Grasewicz arranged for the painting to be replaced by a copy and the original to be secretly transported back to the Church of the Holy Spirit in Vilnius, where it underwent a restoration that significantly changed its appearance, and it was then displayed and venerated in the church. In 2003, the painting, which had deteriorated because of exposure, attempts at cleaning, and the previous restoration, was professionally restored to its original look. In 2005, it was moved to its current location, above the main altar in the Sanctuary of Divine Mercy in Vilnius.

In 2016, a documentary film, The Original Image of Divine Mercy, was released and told the story of the original Divine Mercy painting and its survival over the decades. Made with the co-operation of the Archdiocese of Vilnius, the film included interviews with Jim Gaffigan, Bishop Robert Barron, Harry Connick Jr., and Archbishop Gintaras Grusas, who also served as executive producer.

 Hyła painting 

Another painting of the Divine Mercy was made by Adolf Hyła as a votive offering. In painting the picture, Hyła expressed his gratitude for the survival of his family during World War II.

Hyła was given the descriptions from Kowalska's diary by the nuns at the convent and a small copy of the first painting. Hyła's image is somewhat different from Kazimirowski's, as the former figured Jesus as a "Divine Physician" who walks the earth and heals people. He has Jesus approaching the viewer, instead of merely standing. Christ's right hand is lifted up high in benediction, and He is looking into the eyes of the viewer. The original version of the painting had a country landscape in the background, which was removed in a later replica, as it was deemed "non-liturgical".

The Hyła rendition is also called the "Kraków Divine Mercy Image" because it is kept in the sanctuary at Kraków-Łagiewniki at the Divine Mercy Sanctuary, Kraków. Many artistic renditions of this image were created such as The Divine Mercy Parish in Madaluyong, Philippines which was constructed in 1992 due to vast devotion of itself since 1985.

Other versions
Before Hyła offered his votive painting, the sisters had commissioned Stanisław Batowski to paint a third version. It was lost in a fire, and Batowski painted a fourth painting, which arrived at the convent at almost the same time as Hyła's. Cardinal Sapieha, who happened to be in the convent then, selected the Hyła painting because it was a votive image. A number of other artists have painted the image, but Hyła's rendition remains the most reproduced one.

"The image of The Divine Mercy, painted by Adam Styka (1957), [is] displayed in the Sanctuary of The Divine Mercy at the Congregation of Marians in Stockbridge, MA USA." (Diary pictures of images) it was later removed in 2022 during renovation works and relocated to a safe vault in the church.

Another popular image was created in 1982 by American artist Robert Skemp, an illustrator of pop fiction paintings and posters during the baby boomer era. This rendition depicts Jesus standing in front of an arched doorway, with a more pronounced halo about his head. Skemp was a devoted Catholic during his lifespan and had construct his will to paint the sacred image prior upon his death in 1984. The Skemp and Hyła images are the most ubiquitous depictions found in the Philippines, where the devotion to the Divine Mercy is a popular one. The Skemp version of this image was recreated in various places and churches in the Philippines, particularly in Bulacan, where the eighty foot tall image of a replica bearing the Tagalog inscription of "Jesus I Trust In You" is displayed at the National Shrine of the Divine Mercy in 2002.

The Divine Mercy Shrine, Misamis Oriental, in El Salvador, Philippines, was built in 2008, and has a 15.24 m (50 ft) statue of the Divine Mercy towering above the shrine.CBCP News (Catholic Bishops Conference of the Philippines) March 28, 2008: "Divine Mercy Sunday in Mindanao" 

Banning
In 1959, the Vatican banned the image and its devotion for a number of factors. Some Polish bishops questioned Kowalska's claims and were uncomfortable with the image's similarity to the red-and-white Polish flag. Polish priests were reported to be interpreting the rays as a symbol of the flag. The ban on the image and devotion to it was lifted only on April 15, 1978, after pressure from Pope John Paul II, who was a great advocate for Kowalska.

See also
 Hour of Mercy
 O Blood and Water
 Divine Mercy Sanctuary (Kraków)
 Divine Mercy Sanctuary (Płock)
 Works of Mercy

References

Sources
 Diary: Divine Mercy in My Soul'' by Faustina Kowalska 2003  (online version)

External links
 The Congregation of the Sisters of Our Lady of Mercy
 The Chapel of Saint Faustina on-line transmissions
 Sanctuary of the Divine Mercy 
 The Divine Mercy Message from Saint Faustina
 Divine Mercy images world distribution
  Source of Divine Mercy Images in Canada
 Divine Mercy image film 

Iconography of Jesus
Paintings depicting Jesus
Votive offering
Divine Mercy
Catholicism in Lithuania